Peter Andreas Thiel (born 11 October 1967) is a German-American billionaire entrepreneur, venture capitalist, and political activist. A co-founder of PayPal, Palantir Technologies, and Founders Fund, he was the first outside investor in Facebook. , Thiel had an estimated net worth of $7.19 billion and was ranked 297th on the Bloomberg Billionaires Index.

He worked as a securities lawyer at Sullivan & Cromwell, as a speechwriter for former U.S. Secretary of Education William Bennett and as a derivatives trader at Credit Suisse. He founded Thiel Capital Management in 1996. He co-founded PayPal with  Max Levchin and Luke Nosek in 1998, serving as chief executive officer until its sale to eBay in 2002 for $1.5 billion.

After PayPal, he founded Clarium Capital, a global macro hedge fund based in San Francisco. In 2003, he launched Palantir Technologies, a big data analysis company, serving as its chairman since its inception. In 2005, he launched Founders Fund with PayPal partners Ken Howery and Luke Nosek. Earlier, Thiel became Facebook's first outside investor when he acquired a 10.2% stake for $500,000 in August 2004. He sold the majority of his shares in Facebook for over $1 billion in 2012, but remains on the board of directors. He co-founded Valar Ventures in 2010; co-founded Mithril Capital, serving as investment committee chair, in 2012; and served as a part-time partner at Y Combinator from 2015 to 2017.

Through the Thiel Foundation, Thiel governs the grant-making bodies Breakout Labs and Thiel Fellowship, and funds non-profit research into artificial intelligence, life extension, and seasteading. In 2016, Thiel confirmed that he had funded Hulk Hogan in the Bollea v. Gawker lawsuit because Gawker had previously outed Thiel as gay. The lawsuit eventually bankrupted Gawker and led to founder Nick Denton declaring bankruptcy. Thiel is a conservative libertarian who has made substantial donations to American right-wing figures and causes.

Early life and education

Thiel was born in Frankfurt am Main, West Germany, on 11 October 1967, to Klaus Friedrich Thiel and his wife Susanne Thiel. The family migrated to the United States when Peter was one year old and lived in Cleveland, Ohio, where his father worked as a chemical engineer. Klaus then worked for various mining companies, creating an itinerant upbringing for Thiel and his younger brother, Patrick Michael Thiel. Thiel's mother became a U.S. citizen, but his father did not.

Before settling in Foster City, California, in 1977, the Thiels lived in South Africa and South West Africa (modern-day Namibia). Peter changed elementary schools seven times. He attended a strict establishment in Swakopmund that required students to wear uniforms and utilized corporal punishment, such as striking students' hands with a ruler. This experience instilled a distaste for uniformity and regimentation later reflected in his support for individualism and libertarianism.

Thiel played Dungeons & Dragons, was an avid reader of science fiction, with Isaac Asimov and Robert A. Heinlein among his favorite authors, and a fan of J. R. R. Tolkien's works, stating as an adult that he had read The Lord of the Rings over ten times. Six firms (Palantir Technologies, Valar Ventures, Mithril Capital, Lembas LLC, Rivendell LLC and Arda Capital) that he founded adopted names originating from Tolkien.

Thiel excelled in mathematics and scored first in a California-wide mathematics competition while attending Bowditch Middle School in Foster City. At San Mateo High School, he read Ayn Rand, admired the optimism and anti-communism of then-President Ronald Reagan, and became valedictorian of his graduating class in 1985.

He studied philosophy at Stanford University. During that time, debates on identity politics and political correctness were ongoing. A "Western Culture" program, which was criticized by The Rainbow Agenda because of a perceived over-representation of the achievements of European men, was replaced with a "Culture, Ideas and Values" course, which instead pushed diversity and multiculturalism. This replacement provoked controversy on the campus and led to Thiel co-founding The Stanford Review, a conservative and libertarian newspaper, in 1987 with funding from Irving Kristol. Thiel served as The Stanford Review's first editor-in-chief and remained in that post until completing his Bachelor of Arts in 1989. Over the years, Thiel has continued that relationship, consulting with the top editorial staff several times a year, hosting events at his house, donating to the newspaper and placing graduating students in internships or jobs within his network.

Thiel enrolled in Stanford Law School and earned his Juris Doctor degree in 1992.

While at Stanford, Thiel met René Girard, whose mimetic theory influenced him. Mimetic theory posits that human behavior is based upon mimesis, and that imitation can engender pointless conflict. Girard notes the productive potential of competition: "It is because of this unprecedented capacity to promote competition within limits that always remain socially, if not individually, acceptable that we have all the amazing achievements of the modern world," but states that competition stifles progress once it becomes an end in itself: "rivals are more apt to forget about whatever objects are the cause of the rivalry and instead become more fascinated with one another." Thiel applied this theory to his personal life and business ventures, stating: "The big problem with competition is that it focuses us on the people around us, and while we get better at the things we're competing on, we lose sight of anything that's important, or transcendent, or truly meaningful in our world."

Career

Early career
After graduating from Stanford Law School, Thiel clerked for Judge James Larry Edmondson of the United States Court of Appeals for the 11th Circuit. Thiel then worked as a securities lawyer for Sullivan & Cromwell in New York.  He left the law firm after seven months and three days, citing a lack of transcendental value in his work. He then took a job as a derivatives trader in currency options at Credit Suisse. He joined them in 1993 while also working as a speechwriter for former  United States Secretary of Education William Bennett, before returning to California in 1996 to seek a more meaningful occupation.

Upon returning to the Bay Area, Thiel noticed that the development of the internet and personal computer had launched the dot-com boom. With financial support from friends and family, he raised $1 million toward the establishment of Thiel Capital Management and embarked on his venture capital career. Early on, he experienced a setback after investing $100,000 in his friend Luke Nosek's unsuccessful web-based calendar project. His luck changed when Nosek's friend Max Levchin introduced him to his cryptography-related company idea, which later became their first venture called Confinity in 1998.

PayPal

With Confinity, Thiel realized they could develop software to bridge a gap in making online payments. Although the use of credit cards and expanding automated teller machine networks provided consumers with more payment options, not all merchants had the necessary hardware to accept credit cards. Thus, consumers had to pay with exact cash or check. Thiel wanted to create a type of digital wallet for consumer convenience and security by encrypting data on digital devices, and in 1999 Confinity launched PayPal.

PayPal promised to open up new possibilities for handling money. Thiel viewed PayPal's mission as liberating people from the erosion of the value of their currencies due to inflation. Thiel spoke in 1999:

When PayPal launched at a press conference in 1999, representatives from Nokia and Deutsche Bank sent $3 million in venture funding to Thiel using PayPal on their PalmPilots. PayPal then continued to grow through mergers in 2000 with Elon Musk's online financial services company X.com, and with Pixo, a company specializing in mobile commerce. These mergers allowed PayPal to expand into the wireless phone market, and transformed it into a safer and more user-friendly tool by enabling users to transfer money via a free online registration and email rather than by exchanging bank account information.

PayPal went public on 15 February 2002 and was bought by eBay for $1.5 billion in October of that year. Thiel remained CEO of the company until the sale. His 3.7% stake in the company was worth $55 million at the time of acquisition.  In Silicon Valley circles, Thiel is colloquially referred to as the "Don of the PayPal Mafia".

Clarium Capital

Thiel used $10 million of his proceeds to create Clarium Capital Management, a global macro hedge fund focusing on directional and liquid instruments in currencies, interest rates, commodities, and equities. Thiel stated that "the big, macroeconomic idea that we had at Clarium—the idée fixe—was the peak-oil theory, which was basically that the world was running out of oil, and that there were no easy alternatives."

In 2003, Thiel successfully bet that the United States dollar would weaken. In 2004, Thiel spoke of the dot-com bubble having migrated, in effect, into a growing bubble in the financial sector, and specified General Electric and Walmart as vulnerable. In 2005, Clarium saw a 57.1% return as Thiel predicted that the dollar would rally.

However, Clarium faltered in 2006 with a 7.8% loss. During this time, the firm sought to profit in the long-term from its petrodollar analysis, which foresaw the impending decline in oil supplies and the unsustainable bubble growing in the U.S. housing market. Clarium's assets under management grew after achieving a 40.3% return in 2007 to more than $7 billion by 2008, but fell as financial markets collapsed near the start of 2009. By 2011, after missing out on the economic rebound, many key investors pulled out, reducing the value of Clarium's assets to $350 million, two thirds of which was Thiel's money.

Palantir

In May 2003, Thiel incorporated Palantir Technologies, a big data analysis company named after the Tolkien artifact. He continues to serve as its chairman as of 2022. Thiel stated that the idea for the company was based on the realization that "the approaches that PayPal had used to fight fraud could be extended into other contexts, like fighting terrorism". He also stated that, after the September 11 attacks, the debate in the United States was "will we have more security with less privacy or less security with more privacy?". He envisioned Palantir as providing data mining services to government intelligence agencies that were maximally unintrusive and traceable.

Palantir's first backer was the Central Intelligence Agency's venture capital arm In-Q-Tel. The company steadily grew and in 2015 was valued at $20 billion, with Thiel being the company's largest shareholder.

Facebook

In August 2004, Thiel made a $500,000 angel investment in Facebook for a 10.2% stake in the company and joined Facebook's board. This was the first outside investment in Facebook, and valued the company at $4.9 million. As a board member, Thiel was not actively involved in Facebook's operations. He provided help with timing the various rounds of funding and Zuckerberg credited Thiel with helping him time Facebook's 2007 Series D, which closed before the 2008 financial crisis.

In his book The Facebook Effect, David Kirkpatrick outlines how Thiel came to make this investment: Napster co-founder Sean Parker, who at the time had assumed the title of "President" of Facebook, was seeking investors. Parker approached Reid Hoffman, the CEO of work-based social network LinkedIn. Hoffman liked Facebook but declined to become lead investor because of the potential for conflict of interest. Hoffman directed Parker to Thiel, whom he knew from their PayPal days. Thiel met Parker and Facebook founder Mark Zuckerberg. Thiel and Zuckerberg got along well and Thiel agreed to lead Facebook's seed round with $500,000 for 10.2% of the company. The investment was originally in the form of a convertible note, to be converted to equity if Facebook reached 1.5 million users by the end of 2004. Although Facebook narrowly missed the target, Thiel allowed the loan to be converted to equity anyway. Thiel said of his investment:

I was comfortable with them pursuing their original vision. And it was a very reasonable valuation. I thought it was going to be a pretty safe investment.

In September 2010, Thiel, while expressing skepticism about the potential for growth in the consumer Internet sector, argued that relative to other Internet companies, Facebook (which then had a secondary market valuation of $30 billion) was comparatively undervalued.

Facebook's initial public offering was in May 2012, with a market cap of nearly $100 billion ($38 a share), at which time Thiel sold 16.8 million shares for $638 million. In August 2012, immediately upon the conclusion of the early investor lock-up period, Thiel sold almost all of his remaining stake for between $19.27 and $20.69 per share, or $395.8 million, for a total of more than $1 billion. He retained his seat on the board of directors. In 2016, he sold a little under 1 million of his shares for around $100 million. In November 2017, he sold another 160,805 shares for $29 million, putting his holdings in Facebook at 59,913 Class A shares. As of April 2020, he owned less than 10,000 shares in Facebook.

On 7 February 2022, Thiel announced he would not stand for re-election to the board of Facebook owner Meta at the 2022 annual stockholders' meeting and will leave after serving 17 years in order to support pro Donald Trump candidates in the 2022 United States elections.

Founders Fund

In 2005, Thiel created Founders Fund, a San Francisco-based venture capital fund. Other partners in the fund include Sean Parker, Ken Howery, and Luke Nosek.

In addition to Facebook, Thiel made early-stage investments in numerous startups (personally or through Founders Fund), including Airbnb, Slide.com, LinkedIn, Friendster, RapLeaf, Geni.com, Yammer, Yelp Inc., Spotify, Powerset, Practice Fusion, MetaMed, Vator, SpaceX, Palantir Technologies, IronPort, Votizen, Asana, Big Think, CapLinked, Quora, Nanotronics Imaging, Rypple, TransferWise, Stripe, Block.one, and AltSchool.

In 2017, Founders Fund bought about $15–20 million worth of bitcoin. In January 2018, the firm told investors that due to the cryptocurrency's surge the holdings were worth hundreds of millions of dollars.

Also in 2017, Thiel was one of the first outside investors in Clearview AI, a facial recognition technology startup that has raised concerns in the tech world and media for its risks of weaponization.

Valar Ventures

Through Valar Ventures, an internationally focused venture firm he cofounded with Andrew McCormack and James Fitzgerald, Thiel was an early investor in Xero, a software firm headquartered in New Zealand. Valar Ventures also invested in New Zealand-based companies Pacific Fibre and Booktrack.

Mithril Capital
In June 2012, he launched Mithril Capital Management, named after the fictitious metal in The Lord of the Rings, with Jim O'Neill and Ajay Royan. Unlike Clarium Capital, Mithril Capital, a fund with $402 million at the time of launch, targets companies that are beyond the startup stage and ready to scale up.

Y Combinator
In March 2015, Thiel joined Y Combinator as one of 10 part-time partners. In November 2017, it was reported that Y Combinator had severed its ties with Thiel.

Gawker lawsuit 

In May 2016, Thiel confirmed in an interview with The New York Times that he had paid $10 million in legal expenses to finance several lawsuits brought by others, including a lawsuit by Terry Bollea (Hulk Hogan) against Gawker Media for invasion of privacy, intentional infliction of emotional distress, and infringement of personality rights after Gawker made sections of a sex tape involving Bollea public. The jury awarded Bollea $140 million, and Gawker announced it was permanently closing due to the lawsuit in August 2016.  Thiel referred to his financial support of Bollea's case as one of the "greater philanthropic things that I've done."

Thiel said he was motivated to sue Gawker after they published a 2007 article publicly outing him, headlined "Peter Thiel is totally gay, people." Thiel stated that Gawker articles about others, including his friends, had "ruined people's lives for no reason," and said, "It's less about revenge and more about specific deterrence." I think much more highly of journalists than that. It's precisely because I respect journalists that I do not believe they are endangered by fighting back against Gawker."

On 15 August 2016, Thiel published an opinion piece in The New York Times in which he argued that his defense of online privacy went beyond Gawker. He highlighted his support for the Intimate Privacy Protection Act, and said that athletes and business executives have the right to stay in the closet as long as they want to.

Political activities 
Thiel is a self-described conservative libertarian, though more recently he has espoused support for national conservatism, and criticized economically liberal attitudes towards free trade and big tech. In 2019, Thiel called Google "seemingly treasonous" and urged a government investigation, citing Google's work with China and asking whether DeepMind or Google's senior management had been "infiltrated" by foreign intelligence agencies.

Thiel is a member of the Steering Committee of the Bilderberg Group, a private, annual gathering of intellectual figures, political leaders, and business executives.

Support for political activism
Thiel, who is gay, has supported mostly conservative gay rights causes such as the American Foundation for Equal Rights and GOProud.  He invited conservative columnist and friend Ann Coulter to Homocon 2010 as a guest speaker. Coulter later dedicated her 2011 book, Demonic: How the Liberal Mob Is Endangering America, to Thiel. Thiel is mentioned in the acknowledgments of Coulter's ¡Adios, America!: The Left's Plan to Turn Our Country Into a Third World Hellhole. In 2012, Thiel donated $10,000 to Minnesotans United for All Families, in order to fight Minnesota Amendment 1 that proposed to ban marriage between same-sex couples there.

In 2009, it was reported that Thiel helped fund college student James O'Keefe's "Taxpayers Clearing House" video—a satirical look at the Wall Street bailout. O'Keefe went on to produce the ACORN undercover sting videos but, through a spokesperson, Thiel denied involvement in the ACORN sting.

In July 2012, Thiel made a $1 million donation to the Club for Growth, a fiscally conservative 501(c)(4) organization, becoming the group's largest contributor. Club for Growth is a conservative organization with an agenda focused on cutting taxes and other economic issues.

Support for political candidates
Thiel is a member of the Republican Party. He contributes to both Libertarian and Republican candidates and causes.

In December 2007, Thiel endorsed Ron Paul for President. After Paul failed to secure the Republican nomination, Thiel contributed to the John McCain campaign.

In 2010, Thiel supported Meg Whitman in her unsuccessful bid for the governorship of California. He contributed the maximum allowable $25,900 to the Whitman campaign.

In 2012, Thiel, along with Nosek and Scott Banister, put their support behind the Endorse Liberty Super PAC. Collectively they gave $3.9 million to Endorse Liberty, whose purpose was to promote Ron Paul. As of 31 January 2012, Endorse Liberty reported spending about $3.3 million promoting Paul by setting up two YouTube channels, buying ads from Google, Facebook and StumbleUpon, and building a presence on the Web. After Paul again failed to secure the nomination, Thiel contributed to the Mitt Romney/Paul Ryan presidential ticket of 2012.

Thiel initially supported Carly Fiorina's campaign during the 2016 GOP presidential primary elections. After Fiorina dropped out, Thiel supported Donald Trump and became one of the California delegates for Trump's nomination. He was a headline speaker during the convention, during which he announced that he was "proud to be gay," for which the assembled Republicans cheered. On 15 October 2016, Thiel announced a $1.25 million donation in support of Donald Trump's presidential campaign. Thiel stated to The New York Times: "I didn't give him any money for a long time because I didn't think it mattered, and then the campaign asked me to." After Trump's victory, Thiel was named to the executive committee of the President-elect's transition team.

Thiel also has his own political-action committee, Free Forever, which is committed to supporting political candidates who support stricter border control, restrictive immigration policy, funds for veterans, and anti-interventionist foreign policy, among other things.

By February 2022, Thiel was one of the largest donors to Republican candidates in the 2022 election campaign with more than $20.4 million in contributions. He supported 16 senatorial and congressional candidates, several of whom were proponents of the falsehood that there was significant voter fraud in the 2020 election. Two of said senatorial candidates (Blake Masters and J. D. Vance) were also tech investors who had previously worked for Thiel.

Philanthropy 

Thiel carries out most of his philanthropic activities through the Thiel Foundation.

Research

Artificial intelligence
In 2006, Thiel provided $100,000 of matching funds to back the Singularity Challenge donation drive of the Singularity Institute for Artificial Intelligence (now known as the Machine Intelligence Research Institute), a nonprofit organization that promotes the development of friendly artificial intelligence. He provided half of the $400,000 matching funds for the 2007 donation drive, and as of 2013 the Thiel Foundation had donated over $1 million to the institute. Additionally, he has spoken at multiple Singularity Summits. At the 2009 Singularity Summit, he said his greatest concern is the technological singularity not arriving soon enough.

In December 2015, OpenAI announced that Thiel was one of their financial backers, a nonprofit company aimed at the safe development of artificial general intelligence.

Thiel also backed DeepMind, a UK start-up that was acquired by Google in early 2014 for £400 million.

Life extension
In September 2006, Thiel announced that he would donate $3.5 million to foster anti-aging research through the non-profit Methuselah Mouse Prize foundation. He gave the following reasons for his pledge: "Rapid advances in biological science foretell of a treasure trove of discoveries this century, including dramatically improved health and longevity for all. I'm backing Dr. [Aubrey] de Grey, because I believe that his revolutionary approach to aging research will accelerate this process, allowing many people alive today to enjoy radically longer and healthier lives for themselves and their loved ones." As of February 2017, he had donated over $7 million to the foundation.

When asked "What is the biggest achievement that you haven't achieved yet?" by the moderator of a discussion panel at the Venture Alpha West 2014 conference, Thiel said he wants to make progress on anti-aging research. Thiel also said that he is registered to be cryonically preserved, meaning that he would be subject to low-temperature preservation in case of his legal death in hopes that he might be successfully revived by future medical technology, and is signed up with the Alcor Life Extension Foundation.

Seasteading
On 15 April 2008, Thiel pledged $500,000 to the newly created non-profit Seasteading Institute, directed by Patri Friedman, whose mission is "to establish permanent, autonomous ocean communities to enable experimentation and innovation with diverse social, political, and legal systems." At one of the institute's conferences, he described seasteading as "one of the few technological frontiers that has the promise to create a new space for human freedom." In 2011, Thiel gave $1.25 million to the Seasteading Institute, but resigned from its board the same year. In a 2017 interview with The New York Times, Thiel said seasteads are "not quite feasible from an engineering perspective" and "still very far in the future".

Thiel Fellowship
On 29 September 2010, Thiel created the Thiel Fellowship, which annually awards $100,000 to 20 people under the age of 23 in order to spur them to drop out of college and create their own ventures. According to Thiel, for many young people, college is the path to take when they have no idea what to do with their lives:

Breakout Labs
In November 2011, the Thiel Foundation announced the creation of Breakout Labs, a grant-making program intended "to fill the funding gap that exists for innovative research outside the confines of an academic institution, large corporation, or government." It offers grants of up to $350,000 to science-focused start-ups, "with no strings attached". In April 2012, Breakout Labs announced its first set of grantees. In total, 12 startups received funding, for a total of $4.5 million in grants. One of the first ventures to receive funding from Breakout Labs was 3Scan, a tissue imaging platform.

Other causes
The Thiel Foundation is a supporter of the Committee to Protect Journalists (CPJ), which promotes the right of journalists to report the news freely without fear of reprisal. Beginning in 2008, Thiel has donated over $1 million to the CPJ. He is also a supporter of the Human Rights Foundation, which organizes the Oslo Freedom Forum. In 2011 he was a featured speaker at the Oslo Freedom Forum, and the Thiel Foundation was one of the event's main sponsors.

In 2011, Thiel made a NZ$1 million donation to an appeal fund for the casualties of the Christchurch earthquake.

Personal life
Thiel married his long-time partner Matt Danzeisen in October 2017, in Vienna, Austria. Danzeisen works as a portfolio manager at Thiel Capital.

Religious views
Thiel is a self-described Christian and a promoter of René Girard's Christian anthropology. He grew up in an evangelical household but, as of 2011, describes his religious beliefs as "somewhat heterodox", and stated: "I believe Christianity is true but I don't sort of feel a compelling need to convince other people of that." Thiel has participated in Veritas Forum events with the noted theologian N. T. Wright discussing religion, politics, and technology.

During his time at Stanford University, Thiel attended a lecture given by René Girard. Girard, a Catholic, explained the role of sacrifice and the scapegoat mechanism in resolving social conflict, which appealed to Thiel as it offered a basis for his Christian faith without the fundamentalism of his parents.

Chess
Thiel began playing chess at the age of six, and was at one time one of the strongest junior players in the United States. He holds the title of Life Master, but has not competed since 2003. On 30 November 2016, Thiel made the ceremonial first move in the first tiebreak game of the World Chess Championship 2016 between Sergey Karjakin and Magnus Carlsen.

Media appearances
Thiel is an occasional commentator on CNBC, having appeared on both Closing Bell with Kelly Evans, and Squawk Box with Becky Quick. He has been interviewed twice by Charlie Rose on PBS. He has also contributed articles to The Wall Street Journal, First Things, Forbes, and Policy Review, a journal formerly published by the Hoover Institution, on whose board he sits.

In The Social Network, Thiel was portrayed by Wallace Langham. He described the film as "wrong on many levels".

Thiel was the inspiration for the Peter Gregory character on HBO's Silicon Valley. Thiel said of Gregory, "I liked him... I think eccentric is always better than evil".

Jonas Lüscher stated in an interview with Basellandschaftliche Zeitung that he based the character Tobias Erkner in his novel Kraft ("Force") on Thiel.

Right Time to Thiel by satirist Jan Böhmermann (2022) is a Bond theme-style song and music video.

New Zealand citizenship
Thiel was a German citizen by birth, and became an American citizen by naturalization. He had received permanent residency in New Zealand in 2007. He had visited the country on four occasions prior to his application for citizenship, and had spent 12 days in New Zealand, fewer than the typical residency requirement of 1350 days. When he applied, he stated he had no intention of living in New Zealand, which is a criterion for citizenship. Then-Minister of Internal Affairs Nathan Guy waived those normal requirements, under an "exceptional circumstances" clause of the Citizenships Act.

He became a New Zealand citizen in 2011, which became public in 2017. In 2015, he purchased a 193-hectare estate near Wānaka, which fitted the classification of "sensitive land" and required foreign buyers to obtain permission from New Zealand's Overseas Investment Office. Thiel did not require permission as he was a citizen.

Thiel's application cited his contribution to the economy—he had founded a venture capital fund in Auckland before applying, and invested $7 million in two local companies—as well as a $1 million donation to the 2011 Christchurch earthquake appeal fund. Rod Drury, founder of Xero, also provided a formal reference for Thiel's application. Thiel's case was cited by critics as an example of how New Zealand passports can be bought, something the New Zealand government denied. At the time that his citizenship was revealed, The New Zealand Herald came out with the report that the New Zealand Defence Force, the Security Intelligence Service and the Government Communications and Security Bureau have long-standing links with Thiel's Palantir.

Roth IRA 
In 2021 it was revealed by ProPublica that Thiel had purchased 1.7 million founders shares in the entity that would become PayPal using $1,700 in a Roth IRA in 1999. Due to the rapid growth in the value of the shares as PayPal grew and was later acquired by eBay, it allowed Thiel to turn his $1700 Roth IRA into an account worth more than $5 billion as of 2019. Most of this increase in the value of the Roth was due to him re-investing his PayPal proceeds into companies like Palantir and Facebook which grew quickly after his investment. If Thiel waits until 2027, he can withdraw the entire $5 billion+ amount tax free.

Awards and honors
 In 2006, Thiel won the Herman Lay Award for Entrepreneurship.
 In 2007, he was honored as a Young Global leader by the World Economic Forum as one of the 250 most distinguished leaders age 40 and under.
 On 7 November 2009, Thiel was awarded an honorary degree from Guatemalan Universidad Francisco Marroquin.
 In 2012, Students For Liberty, an organization dedicated to spreading libertarian ideals on college campuses, awarded Thiel its "Alumnus of the Year" award.
 In February 2013, Thiel received a TechCrunch Crunchie Award for Venture Capitalist of the Year.

Views

Politics
“The Straussian Moment,” an essay written by Thiel in 2004, is sometimes considered to be a fundamental text in his political thinking, and was the subject of a 2019 interview at the Hoover Institution. The essay draws on several thinkers and political theorists and argues that the September 11 attacks upset “the entire political and military framework of the nineteenth and twentieth centuries,” and therefore “a reexamination of the foundations of modern politics” was needed.

Thiel explained in a 2009 essay that he had come to "no longer believe that freedom and democracy are compatible", due in large part to welfare beneficiaries and women in general being "notoriously tough for libertarians" constituencies, and that he had focused efforts on new technologies (namely cyberspace, space colonization and seasteading) that could create "a new space for freedom" beyond current politics. Said essay has been referenced by Curtis Yarvin and Nick Land, the main theorists of the neo-reactionary movement, in their writings.

Innovation
In a 2015 conversation with Tyler Cowen, Thiel claimed that innovative breakthroughs were happening in computing/IT and not the physical world. He laments the lack of progress in space travel, high-speed transit, and medical devices. As a cause for the discrepancy he says: "I would say that we lived in a world in which bits were unregulated and atoms were regulated."

Published books

The Diversity Myth
In 1995, the Independent Institute published The Diversity Myth: Multiculturalism and the Politics of Intolerance at Stanford, which Thiel co-authored along with fellow tech entrepreneur David O. Sacks, and with a foreword by the late Emory University historian Elizabeth Fox-Genovese. The book is critical of political correctness and multiculturalism in higher education and alleges that it has diluted academic rigor. Thiel and Sacks' writings drew criticism from then-Stanford Provost Condoleezza Rice and then-Stanford President Gerhard Casper in describing Thiel and Sacks' view of Stanford as "a cartoon, not a description of our freshman curriculum" and their commentary as "demagoguery, pure and simple."

In 2016, Thiel apologized for two statements he made in the book: 1) "The purpose of the rape crisis movement seems as much about vilifying men as about raising 'awareness'" and 2) "But since a multicultural rape charge may indicate nothing more than belated regret, a woman might 'realize' that she had been 'raped' the next day or even many days later." He stated: "More than two decades ago, I co-wrote a book with several insensitive, crudely argued statements. As I've said before, I wish I'd never written those things. I'm sorry for it. Rape in all forms is a crime. I regret writing passages that have been taken to suggest otherwise."

Zero to One
In Spring 2012, Thiel taught CS 183: Startup at Stanford University. Notes for the course, taken by student Blake Masters, led to a book titled Zero to One: Notes on Startups, or How to Build the Future by Thiel and Masters, which was released in September 2014. (Thiel would later go on to endorse Masters' campaign in the 2022 United States Senate election in Arizona and spend more than $10 million in its support.)

Derek Thompson, writing for The Atlantic, stated Zero to One "might be the best business book I've read". He described it as a "self-help book for entrepreneurs, bursting with bromides" but also as a "lucid and profound articulation of capitalism and success in the 21st century economy."

Tools of Titans
Thiel also has a chapter giving advice in Tim Ferriss' self-help book Tools of Titans: The Tactics, Routines, and Habits of Billionaires, Icons, and World-Class Performers.

References

Bibliography

Further reading
 Chafkin, Max (2021). The Contrarian: Peter Thiel and Silicon Valley's Pursuit of Power. New York: Penguin.

External links

 
 

1967 births
Living people
21st-century American businesspeople
Activists from California
American billionaires
American computer businesspeople
American derivatives traders
American financial analysts
American financiers
American hedge fund managers
American investors
American libertarians
American money managers
American newspaper founders
American technology chief executives
American technology company founders
American transhumanists
Businesspeople from the San Francisco Bay Area
California Republicans
Christian libertarians
Cryonicists
Directors of Facebook
Free speech activists
German LGBT businesspeople
American LGBT businesspeople
New Zealand LGBT businesspeople
LGBT Christians
LGBT conservatism in the United States
Gay men
German billionaires
German emigrants to the United States
German libertarians
IronPort people
Life extensionists
Members of the Steering Committee of the Bilderberg Group
New Zealand billionaires
New Zealand libertarians
New Zealand people of German descent
PayPal people
People associated with cryptocurrency
People from Foster City, California
People with acquired New Zealand citizenship
Private equity and venture capital investors
Right-wing populism in the United States
Stanford Law School alumni
Stanford University alumni
Stanford University faculty
Stock and commodity market managers
Sullivan & Cromwell people
Y Combinator people
Naturalized citizens of the United States